Ranen (lit. Singing) is a moshav in southern Israel. Located in the north-western Negev two kilometres north of Ofakim, it falls under the jurisdiction of Merhavim Regional Council.

History
The moshav was established in 1950 by immigrants from Yemen and was originally named Bitha. In 1952 the residents moved to the site of the Hakam Ha-107 ma'abara and converted it to a moshav, taking the name Bitha.

A group of Karaite Jews from Egypt moved onto the moshav, renaming it Ranen, which like the names of two other moshavim (Tifrah, Gilat) in the area, is taken from the Book of Isaiah 35:2, (The desert,) it shall blossom abundantly, and rejoice, even with joy and singing; the glory of Lebanon shall be given unto it, the excellency of Carmel and Sharon; they shall see the glory of the Lord, the excellency of our God.

References

Moshavim
Populated places established in 1950
Populated places in Southern District (Israel)
Yemeni-Jewish culture in Israel
1950 establishments in Israel